The men's 400 metre freestyle was a swimming event held as part of the swimming at the 1928 Summer Olympics programme. It was the fifth appearance of the event, which was established in 1908. The competition was held from Tuesday to Thursday, 7 to 9 August 1928.

Twenty-six swimmers from 17 nations competed.

Records
These were the standing world and Olympic records (in minutes) prior to the 1928 Summer Olympics.

In the final Alberto Zorrilla bettered the Olympic record to 5:01.6 minutes.

Results

Heats

Tuesday 7 August 1928: The fastest two in each heat and the fastest third-placed from across the heats advanced.

Heat 1

Heat 2

Heat 3

Heat 4

Heat 5

Heat 6

Semifinals

Wednesday 8 August 1928: The fastest three in each semi-final advanced to the final.

Semifinal 1

Semifinal 2

Final

Friday 10 August 1928:

References

External links
Olympic Report
 

Swimming at the 1928 Summer Olympics
Men's events at the 1928 Summer Olympics